Springville is an unincorporated community in the town of Jefferson, Vernon County, Wisconsin, United States. As of 2010, its population was 1,318, however, as of 2020, it has dropped slightly to 1,314.

Notes

Unincorporated communities in Vernon County, Wisconsin
Unincorporated communities in Wisconsin